Dick's Picks Volume 7 is the seventh live album in the Dick's Picks series of releases by the Grateful Dead. It was recorded on September 9, 10, and 11, 1974 at Alexandra Palace in London, England. It was released in March 1997.

Enclosure

Included with the release is a single sheet folded in half, yielding a four-page enclosure.  The front duplicates the cover of the CD and the back contains a drawing of a dragon eating its tail against a background of clouds that merge with the clouds on the cover.

The two pages inside contain a wide black-and-white drawing of the venue by Alfred Meeson.  Above this drawing, in the clouds, are lists of the contents of and credits for the release.

Track listing

Disc one
"Scarlet Begonias" (Garcia, Hunter) – 9:29
"Mexicali Blues" (Barlow, Weir) – 3:36
"Row Jimmy" (Garcia, Hunter) – 8:21
"Black-Throated Wind" (Barlow, Weir) – 7:20
"Mississippi Half-Step Uptown Toodleloo" (Garcia, Hunter) – 8:48
"Beat It On Down the Line" (Fuller) – 3:30
"Tennessee Jed" (Garcia, Hunter) – 7:59
"Playing in the Band" (Hart, Hunter, Weir) – 23:30

Disc two
"Weather Report Suite" > (Anderson, Barlow, Weir) – 18:18 
"Stella Blue" (Garcia, Hunter) – 8:32
"Jack Straw" (Hunter, Weir) – 5:19
"Brown-Eyed Women" (Garcia, Hunter) – 5:07
"Big River" (Cash) – 5:14
"Truckin'" > (Garcia, Hunter, Lesh, Weir) – 10:31
"Wood Green Jam" > (Grateful Dead) – 5:56 
"Wharf Rat" (Garcia, Hunter) – 11:13

Disc three
"Me & My Uncle" (Phillips) – 3:30
"Not Fade Away" (Holly, Petty) – 16:27
 "Dark Star" > (Grateful Dead, Hunter) – 24:08 
"Spam Jam" > (Grateful Dead) – 7:13 
"(Walk Me Out in the) Morning Dew"  (Dobson, Rose) – 13:15
"U.S. Blues" (Garcia, Hunter) – 5:41

Personnel
Grateful Dead
Jerry Garcia – lead guitar, vocals
Bill Kreutzmann – drums
Phil Lesh – bass, vocals
Bob Weir – guitar, vocals
Donna Jean Godchaux – vocals
Keith Godchaux – keyboards
Production
Dick Latvala – tape archivist
Gecko Graphics – design
Bill Candelario – recording
Jeffrey Norman – CD mastering
John Cutler – magnetic scrutinizer
Alfred Meeson – architectural rendering

Recording dates
September 9 – Disc 1 (tracks 1, 2, 3), Disc 2 (tracks 6, 7, 8)
September 10 – Disc 1 (tracks 4 & 5), Disc 2 (tracks 1 & 2), Disc 3 (all tracks)
September 11 – Disc 1 (tracks 6, 7, 8), Disc 2 (tracks 3, 4, 5)

References

07
1997 live albums
Live Southern rock albums